Kaviyo Bach Benti Chaupai (also referred to as Chaupai Sahib) (Gurmukhi: ਕਬਿਯੋਬਾਚ ਬੇਨਤੀ ਚੌਪਈ or ਚੌਪਈ ਸਾਹਿਬ) is a hymn by Guru Gobind Singh. Chaupai is the 404th Charitar of the Charitropakhyan of the Dasam Granth and is a part of a Sikh's Nitnem (daily scripture reading) and read during Amrit Sanchar. Chaupai Sahib begins after the 404 Chittar where two massive battles, including the later between Maha Kal and the devils, is narrated and the struggle of a goddess that was born as a result of the first battle and her quest for the acceptance of the Supreme Being, by her abandoning all other worldly desires, is illustrated.

Benti Chaupai consists of three parts: Kabiyo Bach Benti Chaupai, Arril, Chaupai, Savaiye and Dohra. Kabiyo Bach Benti Chaupai is normally referred to as Chaupai in short.

Dating

Chaupai Sahib, as the author suggests, was completed on Sunday, on eighth day (Ashtami) of waxing moon phase (Shukla Paksha) of Lunar month of Bhadrapada in Vikram Samvat year 1753 (1696 A.D.).

The author says:

Method and purpose

This hymn offers one protection and security and many Sikhs recite this Bani to gain spiritual safety and defense from external and internal enemies, worries and afflictions. The Gurmukhi gives one self-confidence and an upbeat feeling. This Bani gives one the feeling of reliability and dependability on the Lord.

According to the researchers: Gurinder Singh Mann, Leicester UK and Dr Kamalroop Singh, London, the Chaupai Sahib was completed at Gurdwara Bhabour Sahib, Nangal as the closure of Sri Charitropakhyan written by the Tenth Guru. They show the proof of this in their book: Sri Dasam Granth Questions and Answers: London: Archimedes Press, 2011. These authors have received their University degrees on the Sri Dasam Granth Sahib.

References

External links
 Read Beynti Choupai Sahib with Punjabi Lyrics
 Read Beynti Chaupai online 
 Read Beynti Chaupai Bani in Hindi

Sikh terminology
Sikh prayer
Dasam Granth